Night-Lines is an album by American pianist Dave Grusin released in 1984, recorded for the GRP label. The album reached No. 4 on Billboard's Contemporary Jazz chart.

The album's cover is from the November 1983 issue of Electronic Fun with Computers & Games.

Track listing
"Power Wave" (Don Grusin) - 5:12
"Thankful 'n' Thoughtful" (Sylvester Stewart) - 4:12
"St. Elsewhere" (theme from the TV show St. Elsewhere) (Dave Grusin) - 4:16
"Haunting Me" (Randy Goodrum, Jay Graydon) - 5:07
"Secret Place" (Dave Grusin) - 3:36
"Night Lines" (Dave Grusin) - 5:06
"Tick Tock" (Randy Goodrum) - 4:17
"Kitchen Dance" (Dave Grusin) - 4:01
"Somewhere Between Old and New York" (Randy Goodrum, Dave Loggins) - 4:35
"Bossa Baroque" (Dave Grusin) - 4:20

Personnel 
 Dave Grusin – acoustic piano, Rhodes piano, Yamaha GS2, Yamaha DX7, Oberheim OB-Xa, Minimoog, Fairlight synthesizer, LinnDrum programming, percussion 
 Ed Walsh – Fairlight synthesizer programming 
 David Sanborn – saxophone (2)
 Marcus Miller – electric bass (2, 4, 7)
 Lincoln Goines – fretless bass (9)
 Buddy Williams – Simmons drums (9)
 Rubens Bassini – percussion (10)
 Phoebe Snow – lead and backing vocals (2, 9)
 Gary Roda – backing vocals (2)
 Randy Goodrum – lead and backing vocals (4, 6)

Production
 Dave Grusin – producer, arrangements, mixing
 Larry Rosen – producer, additional recording, mixing 
 Josiah Gluck – recording, digital editing 
 Ollie Cotton – additional recording, mix assistant 
 Ted Jensen – mastering at Sterling Sound (New York, NY)
 Peter Lopez – GRP production coordinator 
 Linda M. Mack – production assistant 
 Frank Riley – cover illustration 
 Andy Baltimore – art direction 
 Lee Corey Studios, Inc. – art design

Charts

References

External links
Dave Grusin-Night Lines at Discogs

1983 albums
GRP Records albums
Dave Grusin albums